British singer and songwriter Caron Wheeler has released two studio albums, one live album, one compilation albums, and 14 singles (including 4 as a featured artist). She has sold over 6.6 million records collectively as a solo artist and, with Brown Sugar and Soul II Soul.

Albums

Studio albums

Live albums

Compilation albums

Singles

As lead artist

As featured artist

Album appearances

Soundtrack appearances

See also
 Brown Sugar discography
 Soul II Soul discography

Notes

References

External links
 
 

Discographies of British artists
Pop music discographies
Rhythm and blues discographies